Pitcairnia angustifolia, the pina cortadora, is a plant species in the genus Pitcairnia. It is native to Puerto Rico and the Lesser Antilles.

Cultivars
 Pitcairnia 'Borincana'

References

angustifolia
Flora of the Caribbean
Plants described in 1797
Flora without expected TNC conservation status